Blytheville High School is a comprehensive public high school for students in grades nine through twelve located in Blytheville, Arkansas, United States. It is one of six public high schools in Mississippi County, Arkansas and the only high school managed by the Blytheville School District.

The school serves most of Blytheville and all of Burdette.

History 
In the late 1960s, Blytheville's African-American high school students had the option to transfer from the Richard B. Harrison High School to the white Blytheville High School. Several black students chose Blytheville High School to receive a college preparatory education. In 1970, a federal court judge in nearby Jonesboro ordered the total integration of Blytheville schools.

Curriculum 
The assumed course of study at Blytheville High School is the Smart Core curriculum developed by the Arkansas Department of Education.  Students are engaged in regular and Advanced Placement (AP) coursework and exams prior to graduation, with the opportunity for qualified students to be named honor graduates based on grade point average and additional coursework above minimum requirements. Blytheville High School is a charter member and has been accredited since 1924 by AdvancED (formerly North Central Association).

Athletics 
Blytheville High School's mascot is the Chickasaw and the school colors are maroon and white. Blytheville High School is a member of the Arkansas Activities Association (AAA) and currently competes in the 5A East Conference, which has as its members, Batesville High, Paragould High, Beebe High, Greene County Tech High (Paragould), Forrest City High, Wynne High, and Nettleton High (Jonesboro). For 2012–14, the Blytheville participate in interscholastic competition including baseball, basketball (boys/girls), competitive cheer, competitive dance, cross country, football, golf (boys/girls), softball, tennis (boys/girls), track and field (boys/girls), and volleyball.

The girls gymnastics team won three state championships (1986, 1987, 1997).

Notable alumni 
Fred Akers - former American football coach
Edgar H. Lloyd (ca. 1940) - World War II Medal of Honor recipient 
Whiquitta Tobar - lawyer, activist, and former college basketball player
Michael Utley - award-winning composer, singer and long time member of Jimmy Buffett's Coral Reefer Band and Club Trini.

References

External links 

 

Public high schools in Arkansas
Schools in Mississippi County, Arkansas
Blytheville, Arkansas